"Caramelo" is a song by Puerto Rican singer Ozuna. The track was released on June 11, 2020 through Sony Music Latin as the lead single of the his fourth studio album ENOC (2020). The track, written by Ozuna alongside its respective producers, became a top ten hit in Spain, Colombia, Argentina and other selected European and countries in Latin America. In the United States, the track peaked at the 76th position on the Billboard Hot 100 chart, while reaching the top ten on the Global 200. Ozuna united with Colombian singer Karol G as well as with Puerto Rican rapper Myke Towers for a remixed version of the song, released in August of the same year.

Background
The first rumors of a possible new Ozuna studio album, was when the singer began to put the #ENOC hastag in his social media posts. On June 9, 2020, the singer announced the song through his social networks as the first single of his upcoming project. The song features a remix released on August 17, 2020, with the participation of Karol G and Myke Towers.

Charts

Weekly charts

Year-end charts

Certifications

Release history

See also
List of Billboard number-one Latin songs of 2020

References

2020 songs
2020 singles
Karol G songs
Number-one singles in Spain
Ozuna (singer) songs
Songs written by Ozuna (singer)
Spanish-language songs
Myke Towers songs